Qaleh-ye Mamu (also Romanized as Qal‘eh-ye Mamū and Qal‘eh Mamū; also known as Qālāymelyū) is a village in Badranlu Rural District, in the Central District of Bojnord County, North Khorasan Province, Iran. At the 2006 census, its population was 328, in 76 families.

References 

Populated places in Bojnord County